In mathematics, negafibonacci coding is a universal code which encodes nonzero integers into binary code words. It is similar to Fibonacci coding, except that it allows both positive and negative integers to be represented. All codes end with "11" and have no "11" before the end.

Encoding method 

To encode a nonzero integer X:

 Calculate the largest (or smallest) encodeable number with N bits by summing the odd (or even) negafibonacci numbers from 1 to N.
 When it is determined that N bits is just enough to contain  X, subtract the Nth negafibonacci number from X, keeping track of the remainder, and put a one in the Nth bit of the output.
 Working downward from the Nth bit to the first one, compare each of the corresponding negafibonacci numbers to the remainder. Subtract it from the remainder if the absolute value of the difference is less, AND if the next higher bit does not already have a one in it. A one is placed in the appropriate bit if the subtraction is made, or a zero if not.
 Put a one in the N+1th bit to finish.

To decode a token in the code, remove the last "1", assign the remaining bits the values 1, −1, 2, −3, 5, −8, 13... (the negafibonacci numbers), and add the "1" bits.

Negafibonacci representation 

Negafibonacci coding is closely related to negafibonacci representation, a positional numeral system sometimes used by mathematicians. The negafibonacci code for a particular nonzero integer is exactly that of the integer's negafibonacci representation, except with the order of its digits reversed and an additional "1" appended to the end.  The negafibonacci code for all negative numbers has an odd number of digits, while those of all positive numbers have an even number of digits.

Table 
The code for the integers from −11 to 11 is given below.

See also 
 Fibonacci numbers
 Golden ratio base
 Zeckendorf's theorem

References

Works cited 

 
  In the pre-publication draft of section 7.1.3 see in particular pp. 36–39.
 

Non-standard positional numeral systems
Lossless compression algorithms
Fibonacci numbers

fr:Codage de Fibonacci